Señorita Panamá 1996, the 14th Señorita Panamá pageant and 31st celebration of the Miss Panamá contest, was held in Teatro Anayansi Centro de Convenciones Atlapa, Panama City, Panama, September 1996, after weeks of events. The winner of the pageant was Lía Borrero.

The pageant was broadcast live on RPC-TV Panamá. About 15 contestants from all over Panamá competed for the prestigious crown. At the conclusion of the final night of competition, outgoing titleholder Reyna Royo of Panama Centro crowned Lía Victoria Borrero González of Los Santos as the new Señorita Panamá.

In the same night was celebrated the election of the Señorita Panamá World,  was announced the winner of the Señorita Panamá Mundo title. Señorita Panamá World 1995, Marisela Moreno Montero of Panama Centro crowned Norma Elida Pérez Rodriguez of Panama Centro as the new Señorita Panamá World. Also was selected the representative for the Nuestra Belleza Internacional pageant, Amelie González Assereto of Panama Centro was crowned by Patricia De León Barichovicht, Señorita Panamá Hispanidad 1995 of Panama Centro.

Lía Borrero competed in the 46th edition of the Miss Universe 1997 pageant, was held at the Miami Beach Convention Center, Miami Beach, Florida, United States on May 16, 1997. She was top 6.

In other hands Norma Elida Pérez competed in Miss World 1996, the 46th edition of the Miss World pageant, took place on 23 November 1996 in the city of Bangalore, India. González Assereto competed in Nuestra Belleza Internacional 1996 the 3rd edition of Nuestra Belleza Internacional Pageant held on November 25, 1996 in Miami, United States.

Final result

Special awards

Contestants
These are the competitors who have been selected this year.

Election schedule

Thursday September  Final night, coronation Señorita Panamá 1996

Candidates Notes

Lía Borrero also compete for Panamá in the Miss International 1998 won the title.

Historical significance

Los Santos won Señorita Panamá for five time, the last time with Gabriela Ducaza, 1987.

References

External links
  Señorita Panamá  official website

Señorita Panamá
1996 beauty pageants